Franco Cheung Ching-ho (born 27 January 1987) is a Hong Kongese writer and former district councilor of the North District Council Fanling South constituency.

Biography

Early life 
Cheung was born in Hong Kong on 27 January 1987. He graduated from Hong Kong Shue Yan University with a bachelor's degree in Chinese language and literature. He worked as a cram school Chinese tutor for five years after graduation, before quitting his job and becoming a taxi driver as Cheung wanted to pursue a more free but challenging lifestyle. In 2017, Cheung published Taxi, a prose collection which recorded some of his most memorable incidents as a taxi driver. It won the annual Hong Kong Book Awards in lifestyle and encyclopedic category.

Political career 
During the early stages of 2019-2020 Hong Kong protests, Cheung was a volunteer driver who would pick up young protestors and drive them home. Cheung was moved by the protestors' courage and persistence and participated in the 2019 Hong Kong local elections as an independent candidate. He won the election against Raymond Ho and Almustafa Lee and became the district councilor of Fanling South constituency.

In 2021, he resigned to avoid the mandatory oath-taking requirement after the legislation of Hong Kong national security law.

Personal life 
Cheung was married to web novelist Wait to be Written in 2020, and they migrated to the United Kingdom in 2021.

Bibliography 
Taxi (2017) 
Taxi 2 (2018) 
Blue Taxi (2021)

References

External links 
 

District councillors of North District
Hong Kong pan-democrats
Hong Kong writers
1987 births
Living people